Orosei is a comune (municipality) in the Province of Nuoro in the Italian region Sardinia, located about  northeast of Cagliari and about  east of Nuoro.

Orosei borders the following municipalities: Dorgali, Galtellì, Onifai, Siniscola.

References

Cities and towns in Sardinia